The Ghost Tales (Chinese: 變羊記) is a 2012 Taiwanese psychological horror film directed by Tso Shih-chiang.

Plot
Sung Ting-Po (Tsai Chen-nan) is a debt-ridden businessperson. Just as he is planning to go deep into the woods to kill himself, he runs into a ghost (Wu Pong-fong). Ting-Po has long already given up on life and decides to mess with the ghost, who is actually quite timid and turns into a goat. The goat is then picked up by A-chuan (River Huang), himself a talented gardening enthusiast, who has just left the military and takes both his younger sister (Lee Yi-chieh) and the goat to live in a dilapidated block of flats. At this time, through his gardening connections, A-chuan is staging a performance with a former schoolmate (James Wen). A-chuan covets a precious bonsai arrangement valued at over a million NTD, and he gradually loses all rational perspective; even his girlfriend (Lorene Ren) leaves him. Within all of this, the situation envelopes peoples' spirits as things continuously spiral out of control, and the darkness and fear devour all sense of reason.

Cast
 River Huang as A-chuan
 Lorene Ren as Lo Fen
 Lee Yi-chieh as Chi
 Wu Pong-fong as Big Chung / Ghost
 Tsai Chen-nan as Sung Ting-Po
 James Wen as Senior schoolmate
 Julianne Chu
 Nelson Shen as Ching

Production
Tso Shih-chiang reported coming up with the initial concept for the story 10 years before filming began. The film received the largest film subsidy possible in 2011, and filming began in July of the same year.

Release
The film premiered at Yuan Ze University on 10 August 2012 as part of the 'National Roaming Battalion of Literature and Art' festival before release on 7 September.

References

External links
  – official site
 

2012 horror films
Taiwanese horror films
2012 films
Taiwanese supernatural horror films
Taiwanese ghost films